The 2014 Vuelta a España began on 23 August, with Stage 21 scheduled for 14 September. The 2014 edition of the cycle race began with the only team time trial stage of the race, in Jerez de la Frontera.

Stage 1
23 August 2014 — Jerez de la Frontera to Jerez de la Frontera, team time trial (TTT)

Stage 2
24 August 2014 — Algeciras to San Fernando,

Stage 3
25 August 2014 — Cádiz to Arcos de la Frontera,

Stage 4
26 August 2014 — Mairena del Alcor to Córdoba,

Stage 5
27 August 2014 — Priego de Córdoba to Ronda,

Stage 6
28 August 2014 — Benalmádena to La Zubia,

Stage 7
29 August 2014 — Alhendín to Alcaudete,

Stage 8
30 August 2014 — Baeza to Albacete,

Stage 9
31 August 2014 — Carboneras de Guadazaón to Aramón Valdelinares,

Stage 10
2 September 2014 — Real Monasterio de Santa María de Veruela to Borja, individual time trial (ITT)

Stage 11
3 September 2014 — Pamplona to Santuario de San Miguel de Aralar,

Notes

References

2014 Vuelta a España
Vuelta a España stages